The Portrait of the Family Hinlopen or Family of burgomaster Gillis Valckenier is a painting in the Berlin Gemäldegalerie by the Dutch Golden Age painter Gabriël Metsu of about 1663.  There have been various ideas among art historians as to which family is actually represented, with the two main candidates being the families of  Jan J. Hinlopen or Gillis Valckenier, both wealthy and powerful figures in Amsterdam at the time.

Provenance
It is now increasingly accepted that the family are the Hinlopens. In his diary Jan J. Hinlopen made distinct notes about his marriage and family births, dates of baptisms in the Westerkerk Amsterdam, and funerals.

Hinlopen and Leonore Huydecoper, the sister of Joan Huydecoper, had four children by 1663:
 Jacob (October 20, 1658 – Lage Vuursche, July 12, 1664),
 Johanna Maria (April 16, 1659 – June 15, 1706),
 Sara (June 12, 1660 – June 16, 1749), and
 Geertrui (January 1, 1662 – August 14, 1663).

In the second half of 1663 two members of the family died. Jan J. Hinlopen lost his youngest daughter, Geertrui, who died of measles on August 14. On October 28 his wife had a miscarriage. The next day, around ten in the evening, his servant, accompanied by two other men, probably the undertakers, buried a small coffin in the church. On November 1, his wife Leonora died at 5.30 in the morning, after having been ill for seven days. His only son Jacob died at Pijnenburg, their country estate. He was kept isolated because of the plague, which prevailed since October 1663 and made 7,000 more victims in 1664.

After the Geelvinck family, heirs of Sara, ceased to exist in the early 19th century, the traces to the real origins were lost. The Swiss family Tschiffely sold the painting in 1832. In the end of the 19th century it was known as depicting the Familie des Kaufmanns Gelfing. In 1907 the known Dutch art-historian Hofstede de Groot mentioned the parrot in the painting of the Familie Geelvinck. Remarkably he described the painting as langweilig ("boring"). In 1984 also  Bob Haak describes it as depicting the Geelvinck family.

In 1976 Van Eeghen renamed the painting to De familie van burgemeester Gillis Valckenier, and dated it in 1657. This was mainly based on the bird in the painting, which van Eeghen imagined to be a falcon. Irene Groeneweg reasons that the bird, held by the boy, is a Cuban amazon parrot. Another reason to doubt the classification is that, according to the Amsterdam City Archives, burgomaster Gillis Valckenier had only three children at the time of the painting's creation.

Judith van Gent discovered that there was a resemblance with another Hinlopen family portrait by Bartholomeus van der Helst in Berlin.  Additionally she discovered support for her view in Hinlopen's will. Nevertheless, the painting is still sometimes  referred to as: The Family of burgomaster Gillis Valckenier.

Location
 
The atmosphere of the painting indicates a family painted in the luxury of their own home, presumably one of the modern canal mansions of Amsterdam at the time. Unfortunately the interior mantelpiece and paintings portrayed are unrecognizable. However, it was fashionable for members of the Amsterdam regency to depict one's family in the Amsterdam City Hall, which was completed in the 1650s. Being open to the councilmen and containing high windows with much light, the mayors' room would have enabled easy sketching for artists. This painting possibly shows the mantelpiece of the hearth by Artus Quellinus the Elder there with a painting completed by Govert Flinck in 1656.

Other similar scenes are also influenced by the same mantelpiece construction:

References

1663 paintings
Paintings by Gabriël Metsu
Paintings in the Gemäldegalerie, Berlin
Birds in art
Cats in art
Dogs in art
Paintings of children